NGC 328 is a spiral galaxy in the constellation Phoenix. It was discovered on 5 September 1836 by John Herschel. It was described by Dreyer as "very faint, a little extended, very gradually brighter middle, following (eastern) of 2", the other being NGC 323.

References

0328
18360905
Phoenix (constellation)
Barred spiral galaxies
Discoveries by John Herschel
003399